Ban Mai is one of the twelve subdistricts (tambon) of Pak Kret District, in Nonthaburi Province, Thailand. Neighbouring subdistricts are (from north clockwise) Bang Khayaeng, Ban Mai (Pathum Thani Province), Si Kan, Don Mueang, Thung Song Hong, Khlong Kluea and Bang Phut. In 2020 it had a total population of 33,642 people.

Administration

Central administration
The subdistrict is subdivided into 6 villages (muban).

Local administration
The whole area of the subdistrict is covered by Pak Kret City Municipality.

References

External links
Website of Pak Kret City Municipality

Tambon of Nonthaburi province
Populated places in Nonthaburi province